Ellsworth Community College is a public community college in Iowa Falls, Iowa.  It was founded as Ellsworth College in 1890 by Eugene S. Ellsworth.  Originally a private business academy, it later became a four-year college, a music conservatory, and a public junior college before being absorbed into the Iowa Valley Community College District since 1968.

Academics
Ellsworth Community College offers three distinct degree programs.  Arts and Science Degrees are two-year degrees geared toward students who wish to enter the professional workforce but do not plan to earn a degree from a four-year college. Some of the credits earned under this degree program can be transferred to a four-year university, however. Career/Technical Degrees & Diplomas provide hands-on training in a wide variety of vocational fields. The course of study lasts anywhere from nine months to two years.  Associate in Arts Degrees are intended for students who plan to continue their education at a four-year college. The coursework for these degrees is identical to that offered during the freshman and sophomore years at the three state universities in Iowa; any student who transfers into one of those universities having earned an associate degree will be automatically granted junior (third-year) standing.

Athletics
The Ellsworth athletic teams are called the Panthers. The community college is a member of the National Junior College Athletic Association (NJCAA), primarily competing in the Iowa Community College Athletic Conference (ICCAC) at the Division I and Division II levels.

Ellsworth competes in seven intercollegiate varsity sports: Men's sports include baseball, basketball, football and wrestling; while women's sports include basketball, softball and volleyball.

Mascot
The Panthers' mascot is named Pounce.

Accomplishments
The Ellsworth football team has won two NJCAA national championships. The school also won an NJCAA national championship in basketball in 1971.

Notable alumni

 Ken Bishop, professional football player
 Dale Carter, professional football player
 Rich Folkers, professional baseball player
 Joseph Gomer, Tuskegee Airman
 Mistral Raymond, professional football player
 Demetrius Rhaney, professional football player
 Andre Tippett, professional football player
 Tanner Varner, professional football player
 Jaleel Scott, professional football player
 Hernan Ramos, professional baseball player

See also
 Homer D. Calkins

References

External links
 
 Official athletics website

Community colleges in Iowa
Educational institutions established in 1890
Education in Hardin County, Iowa
Buildings and structures in Hardin County, Iowa
NJCAA athletics
1890 establishments in Iowa